Rafed Network for Cultural Development is behind Rafed.net & Rafed.com (شبكة رافد للتنمية الثقافية), one of the most popular Shi'a websites.

Origins
The rafed network is based in Shi'a academic center of the world. It was established by Institute of Ahl al-Bayt (as) for Restoration of Books (Arabic: Institute of āl al-bayt alayhumassalam li-ihya ul-turrāth), a large institute that was established in 1983 and has become one of the largest providers of documentation on Shia scholarship in the world, having branches in UK, Germany, Turkey Lebanon and Syria.

Rafed.net & Rafed.com
They are the owners of Rafed.net, a mainly Arabic site, as can be seen from its main page, but it also has an English section. The site is the most third most visited Shi'a site among Alexa Internet users, second only to Irna.com and al-shia.com.

The site has Qur'an translations in multiple languages, including Spanish, French, Russian, English and the original Arabic.

The site is notable for spreading the scholarship of Grand Ayatollah Ali al-Sistani, and is among several Shi'a sites blocked in Saudi Arabia. Joshua Teitelbaum writes:

See also

 The Ahlulbayt (a.s.) Global Information Center
 Ahlul Bayt Digital Islamic Library Project

References

External links
Rafed.net
Rafed.com

Shia Islamic websites
Shia organizations